Jacques du Toit may refer to:
 Jacques du Toit (cricketer), South African-born cricketer
 Jacques du Toit (rugby union), South African-born rugby union player